Kevin Duckett is a former Australian professional rugby league player. A fullback, he made a total of five NSWRL appearances during the 1980s. He played four games for the St. George Dragons (1986–87), and played in one match for the Eastern Suburbs in 1988.

References

Year of birth missing (living people)
Living people
Australian rugby league players
St. George Dragons players
Sydney Roosters players
Rugby league fullbacks